Zulfiqar Naqvi, born in Gursai  village in Mendhar Tehsil near LoC in District Poonch of Jammu and Kashmir. He is an Urdu poet and has authored Three Books, ZAAD-E-SAFAR in 2011, UJAALU'N KA SAFAR in 2013, DASHT-E-WAHSHAT in 2021.

Career

In 2022 he became a Principal in Department of School Education, Government of Jammu and Kashmir.

See also 
 List of Urdu-language poets
 Farooq Nazki
 Javed Akhtar
 Gulzar
 Rahat Indori
 Munawwar Rana

References 

Urdu-language poets from India
Poets from Jammu and Kashmir
1965 births
Living people
University of Jammu alumni